Tracey Thomson is an American television soap opera writer for CBS Daytime's The Young and the Restless. She is sharing head-writing duties with Charles Pratt Jr. who originally hired her to be a script writer on All My Children. In 2019 she started to write for "Sulphur Springs" with Charles Pratt Jr. She attended the University of Georgia and started her career with CNN in Atlanta before moving to California.

Positions held
General Hospital (hired by Robert Guza Jr.)
Associate Head writer: July 26, 2011-May 2012
Occasional Breakdown writer: May 2007 – July 2008)
Script writer: September 11, 2006 – January 3, 2008; March 17, 2008 - July 30, 2008; June 17, 2010 – July 25, 2011
Occasional script writer: March 28, 2006 – July 13, 2006
Script Continuity: 2005–2006

All My Children
Script Writer (February 17, 2010 - May 6, 2010)
Associate Head Writer (September 11, 2008 - February 18, 2010)
Occasional Script Writer (September 25, 2008 - 2009)

The Young and the Restless (hired by Josh Griffith)
Script Writer: December 4, 2012
Co-Head Writer: December 7, 2012 – March 18, 2015
Associate Head Writer: March 19, 2015 – March 15, 2017

Secrets of Sulphur Springs
Executive Producer and Creator, 2021

References

External links

American soap opera writers
Living people
American women television writers
21st-century American screenwriters
Place of birth missing (living people)
Year of birth missing (living people)
Women soap opera writers
21st-century American women writers